Banpo Township is a township in Jinggu Dai and Yi Autonomous County, Yunnan, China.

Administrative division
As of 2016, the town is divided into nine villages: 
 Banpo
 Mansan
 Anhai
 Bandu
 Banka
 Jiangjia
 Mangdai
 Mangwen
 Bansai

Geography
It lies at the southwestern of Jinggu Dai and Yi Autonomous County, bordering Lancang Lahu Autonomous County and Shuangjiang Lahu, Va, Blang and Dai Autonomous County to the west, Yongping to the northeast, and Mengban Township to the south.

The Waili Stream flows through the northern Banpo Township.

The Lancang River is the western border between Banpo Township and Lancang Lahu Autonomous County and Shuangjiang Lahu, Va, Blang and Dai Autonomous County.

Economy
The region's economy is based on agriculture, animal husbandry, and mineral resources. Tobacco, tea, natural rubber, and walnut are the economic plants of this region. The region has an abundance of copper, iron, lead and zinc.

Demographics

As of 2020, the National Bureau of Statistics of China estimates the township's population now to be 11,213.

References

Bibliography

Townships of Pu'er City
Divisions of Jinggu Dai and Yi Autonomous County